Michael Goodman (born 1954, New York City) is an American photographer.

Work
Michael Goodman is an international construction photographer. As Chief Contributing Photographer to Engineering News Record from 1988 to 2008  Goodman has had over 135 Magazine cover photographs.

With a focus on the urban and industrial landscape, Goodman has covered major construction developments in over 42 countries.

In 1993 Goodman's photos of the World Trade Center attack  was featured in Life Magazine.

Goodman's coverage of the aftermath of Hurricane Katrina in New Orleans is considered the most extensive by, among others, then Editor-in-Chief of Architectural Record, Robert Ivy and in 2006 Goodman's work was selected as the official photography of the recovery efforts representing The United States at the 10th International Architectural Biennale in Venice, Italy.

Awards
 The Construction Writer's Association Gordon B. Wright Photo Journalism Award for Best Series of Related Photographs and,  2004, and Best Feature Photograph, 2007.
 The Jesse H. Neal Award, 2006 for photography work on Dubai.

Exhibitions
 "After the Flood: Building on Higher Ground", A+D Museum, Los Angeles, California, 2008
 Museo Del Canal Interoceanico, Panama City, Panama, 2007
 Collaborative Development Gallery {Code}, Bangkok, Thailand, 2007
 The U.S. Pavilion at the 10th International Architectural Biennale, Venice, Italy, 2006

References

External links
 Official website
 Designboom: Biennial of Architecture 2006
 Stuart A. Rose Manuscript, Archives, and Rare Book Library

Architectural photographers
Photographers from New York (state)
1954 births
Living people